General Edwin Augustus McAlpin (June 9, 1848 – April 12, 1917) was president of the D.H. McAlpin & Co., a tobacco manufacturer. He built the Hotel McAlpin in New York City, at the time the largest hotel in the world. He had an active military career in the New York National Guard and was appointed Adjutant General of New York by the Governor. He was president of the American Boy Scouts and the Mayor of Ossining, New York.

Biography

Military career

General McAlpin was born June 9, 1848, the son of David Hunter McAlpin, a prominent tobacco manufacturer in New York City, and Adelaide Rose McAlpin, in Ossining, New York. McAlpin attended public school for a time, then graduated from Phillips Academy in Andover, Massachusetts in 1861. Following his graduation, McAlpin joined his father’s company, D. H. McAlpin & Co. With the outbreak of hostilities, McAlpin enlisted in the Civil War as a drummer boy, but his father rescinded the action due to his youth at age 17.
After the end of the war, he was old enough to enlist in his own right and in 1869 joined the 7th Regiment of the New York Militia, (later the New York Guard) with the rank of private.

In 1874 McAlpin attained the rank of first lieutenant in the 71st Infantry Regiment (New York) where he was promoted in 1885 to colonel, a role he retained until his military retirement in 1887. McAlpin had inherited a disorganized and dispirited regiment which was in danger of being disbanded by the State of New York. He aggressively cut dead wood from the ranks and reorganized the officer ranks to the extent that the "Army and Navy Journal" called it on July 18, 1885 "virtually a new regiment, so much has its personnel changed during the past six months..." The Journal placed the credit squarely on McAlpin's shoulders writing, "Colonel Edwin A. McAlpin, the but recently elected commander, has certainly developed energy, pluck and good sense in the management of his organization, which has, in turn, been followed by most encouraging results..."

After retiring from the service he was appointed Adjutant General of the State by Governor Levi P. Morton, in 1895 with the rank of Major General. In this role he deployed his units to suppress several disorders in the New York City vicinity, but saw no formal combat.

Personal life
On October 27, 1870, he married Anne Brandreth, daughter of Benjamin Brandreth proprietor of the then-famous “Brandreth Vegetable Universal Pills” from which he had amassed a large fortune. The wedding took place at Trinity Episcopal Church in Ossining and was officiated by Rev. Clarence Buel. Also in that year he was admitted as a partner in his father's firm, the D.H. McAlpin & Co tobacco company.

 In 1895 the couple celebrated their silver wedding anniversary at their house in Ossining, NY, dubbed “Hillside House”. As befitted a prominent person at that time, the couple chartered a train to bring guests from New York City and return them at the end of the evening. "Hillside" was reported by The New York Times to be '...one of the show places of the Hudson River section'. McAlpin purchased the house in 1883 and his son, Colonel Benjamin Brandreth McAlpin sold it in February 1928 to the Imperial Order of the Daughters of the Empire who had plans to use the property as a retirement home for members of the British Empire in the area. Victoria Home, as the home was and is known, opened on 24 November 1928 with 22 residents. In January, 1932 the Home completed a $92,000 expansion which provided room for a total of 41 residents.

Political activities
He was an active worker in the Republican Party and ran an unsuccessful campaign for Congress in 1884. For many years he was treasurer of the Republican Campaign Committee. He was a potential vice presidential candidate alongside William McKinley in the 1896 election. From 1889-1892 he was President of the Republican League of New York. He held several local offices in his home at Ossining, including:
 Village trustee from 1886–98,
 Village President 1889
 Postmaster 1889-1893

Business life
General McAlpin owned several large tracts of real estate in Manhattan, inherited from his father. One tract on 34th Street and Broadway was developed into the Hotel McAlpin. In the lobby of the hotel stood a wooden Indian which once stood outside the family’s tobacco store on Catherine Street in Manhattan; the predecessor to the large tobacco concern which eventually became the D.H. McAlpin & Co. tobacco company.

McAlpin was active in several businesses during his life including:

 President D.H. McAlpin & Co (tobacco)
 President Manhattan Hotel Co
 Vice-President Eleventh Ward Bank
 Vice-president Standard Gaslight Co of New York
 Director, Mutual Bank
 Director Morton Trust Co.
 Trustee Board of Trade and Transportation
 Member Chamber of Commerce

Civic involvement
McAlpin was active in a number of civic organizations including:
 President, Ossining Hospital and Dispensary
 President, YMCA
 Trustee First Presbyterian Church in Ossining

On August 12, 1911 Gen. McAlpin was elected President and Chief Scout of the American Boy Scouts, an early Scouting organization.

Death and children
General McAlpin died at 2pm on April 12, 1917 at his home in Ossining of a cerebral hemorrhage. He is buried at the family vault located at the Dale Cemetery in Ossining.

General McAlpin left five sons:
 Colonel Benjamin Brandreth McAlpin
 Reverend Edwin A. McAlpin
 J. Roderick McAlpin
 Kenneth R. McAlpin
 David Hunter McAlpin 2nd

References

1848 births
1917 deaths
American manufacturing businesspeople
People from Ossining, New York
United States Army generals
People associated with Scouting
Adjutants General of New York (state)
Military personnel from New York (state)
New York (state) Republicans
Mayors of places in New York (state)
New York (state) city council members
New York (state) postmasters
Businesspeople from New York (state)
19th-century American businesspeople